Letnisko Nowy Jadów  is a village in the administrative district of Gmina Jadów, within Wołomin County, Masovian Voivodeship, in east-central Poland.

References

Letnisko Nowy Jadow